Charis Kostakis (born 12 July 1990) is a Greek former professional footballer who played as a midfielder.

Career
Although he was born in Ioannina, Kostakis began playing football in the youth system of Ajax Amsterdam at age 15. Ajax loaned him to Dutch amateur side Stormvogels Telstar at age 19. Soon after, Kostakis returned to Greece and joined Greek second division club Ethnikos Piraeus F.C. on a three-year contract.

In July 2011, Kostakis joined the Czech Cup-winning side FK Mladá Boleslav.

In January 2012, Kostakis joined Iraklis Thessaloniki F.C. and in the following summer he was transferred to Greek Superleague PAS Giannina F.C. Moreover, he has played for NK Domžale in the Slovenian PrvaLiga.

Kostakis has also played for the Greece under-17 national team.

References

External links
 
Profile at EPAE.org 
Myplayer.gr Profile 

FKMB profile 
PrvaLiga profile 
Nogomania profile 

1990 births
Living people
Greek footballers
Greek expatriate footballers
Expatriate footballers in the Czech Republic
Expatriate footballers in Slovenia
Ethnikos Piraeus F.C. players
FK Mladá Boleslav players
Iraklis Thessaloniki F.C. players
PAS Giannina F.C. players
NK Domžale players
Panionios F.C. players
Association football midfielders
Footballers from Ioannina